Canale is a comune (municipality) in the Province of Cuneo in the Italian region Piedmont, located about  southeast of Turin and about  northeast of Cuneo.

Canale borders the following municipalities: Castellinaldo, Cisterna d'Asti, Montà, Monteu Roero, Priocca, San Damiano d'Asti, Santo Stefano Roero, and Vezza d'Alba.

Demographic evolution

References

External links 
 www.comune.canale.cn.it/

Cities and towns in Piedmont
Roero